McInerny is a surname. Notable people with the surname include:

 Emily McInerny (born 1978), Australian women's basketball player
 Kathleen McInerney (born 1965), known professionally as Veronica Taylor, American voice actress
 Nora McInerny, American author
 Ralph McInerny (1929–2010), American author and professor

See also
McInerney